Ji Sung (born Kwak Tae-geun on 27 February 1977) is a South Korean actor. He is best known for his roles in the television dramas All In (2003), Save the Last Dance for Me (2004), New Heart (2007), Protect the Boss (2011),  Secret Love (2013), Kill Me, Heal Me (2015), Innocent Defendant (2017), Familiar Wife (2018), Doctor John (2019), The Devil Judge (2021) and the film  My PS Partner (2012).

Early life
Kwak Tae-geun's parents were both educators, and they expected him to also enter the teaching profession. But in his sophomore year in high school, his father bought him a VCR and the first movie he rented was Rain Man. Dustin Hoffman's acting left such an impression on him that he decided to become an actor, despite his father's objections. He later studied Theater and Film at Hanyang University.

Career

1999–2002: Beginnings
Ji Sung first auditioned for the 1999 campus drama KAIST, where he met screenwriter Song Ji-na. Song took an interest in the young upstart and wrote a new character for him, leading to his acting debut. Upon the suggestion of his then-manager, he began using the stage name Chae Ji-sung, then decided to drop the surname "Chae," and became known simply as "Ji Sung" After several minor roles, he began playing bigger parts, notably in the television dramas Wonderful Days (2001) and Sunshine Hunting 2002), as well as the North-South romantic comedy film Whistling Princess (2002).

2003–2004: Breakthrough
Ji was then cast in the 2003 gambling drama All In. Producers were having difficulty casting the second male lead because most actors were afraid to be compared to lead actor Lee Byung-hun. Ji Sung approached director Yoo Chul-yong, saying he wanted the role. All In was a big hit, and Ji Sung's popularity rose and became known as a Hallyu star. Wanting to challenge himself, he next appeared in his first period drama The King's Woman, playing Gwanghaegun of Joseon.

In Save the Last Dance for Me (2004), he played a rich amnesiac businessman who falls in love with a girl running a bed and breakfast who nurses him back to health (played by Eugene).
He then made a guest appearance playing Bae Jong-ok's college boyfriend in "Outing", a two-episode arc written by Lee Kyung-hee for the omnibus drama Beating Heart (2005), followed by a supporting role in Kim Dae-seung's period thriller Blood Rain (2005).

2005–2007: Enlistment
Ji Sung enlisted on 7 June 2005, for his mandatory military service. Though he initially enlisted as an ordinary soldier, the Military Manpower Administration transferred him to the military promotion ("entertainers") unit in February 2006, for which he served as "public ambassador of military affairs". He was discharged on 6 June 2007.

2008–2014: Comeback and lead roles
He made his comeback in the medical drama New Heart (2007–08), playing a cardiothoracic surgery resident. During a scene where his character cries after failing to save the life of a former comfort woman, Ji Sung said he thought of his maternal grandmother who'd recently died, remembering that she'd told him her only pleasure was watching him in reruns of All In. Contrary to his cheeky, playful character, Ji Sung said that he's taciturn and shy in real life, but that the drama made him find a different side of himself.

He then made an extended cameo as the sophisticated right-hand man of the mob boss in action noir Fate (2008).

In 2009, Ji Sung collaborated again with writer Choi Wan-kyu and director Yoo Chul-yong of All In in the revenge drama 
Swallow the Sun, adapted from the novel by Kang Chul-hwa, and shot on location in Jeju Island, Las Vegas and South Africa. Ji Sung trained hard to play the tough, strong-willed protagonist who goes to prison for his boss and later becomes involved in the city development of Jeju.

In February 2010, he signed with a new management agency, Namoo Actors. Several months later, he played another historical character in Kim Su-ro, The Iron King, as the titular founder of Geumgwan Gaya.

In 2011, Ji Sung starred alongside Yum Jung-ah in Royal Family, about the power plays within a chaebol family. Later that year, he was cast in the workplace romantic comedy Protect the Boss. In a departure from his usual serious roles, Ji Sung played a dorky man-child with a panic disorder, who matures and learns to run his father's business after meeting a feisty secretary (played by Choi Kang-hee).

From 2012 to 2013, Ji Sung played a gifted seer/geomancer in The Great Seer. His fictional character becomes a "kingmaker" to Yi Seong-gye (played by Ji Jin-hee), the general who leads the overthrow of Goryeo and establishes the Joseon Dynasty, becoming its first king Taejo.

In late 2012, he starred in adult romantic comedy My PS Partner, playing an aspiring singer-songwriter trying to get over a breakup, who becomes the wrong recipient of a phone sex call from a woman (played by Kim Ah-joong) trying to seduce her boyfriend into proposing. Ji Sung said he found the script intriguing, despite the discomfort of appearing in bed scenes. And after he saw Love & Other Drugs, he wanted to be in a movie that portrayed a romantic relationship in a realistic manner.

In 2013, Ji Sung starred in  melodrama Secret Love. He said he chose the drama because he found the script "fresh, honest, and sophisticated." He played a chaebol "bad boy" whose girlfriend is killed, then falls for the woman who went to prison for the crime. Ji Sung next appeared in Confession, a 2014 neo-noir film that brutally explores the aftermath of three men's friendship after the death of one's mother.

2015–present: Career resurgence
In 2015, he reunited with Secret Love co-star Hwang Jung-eum in Kill Me, Heal Me, in which he played a chaebol millionaire with dissociative identity disorder formerly known as Multiple Personality Disorder from DSMIV-TR who has seven different identities. The series was a hit and developed a cult following, winning Ji Sung the "Daesang (Grand Prize)" at the MBC Drama Awards.

However, Ji's next work Entertainer, where he played a cunning and self-centered manager of an entertainment company, failed to be successful. Ji bounced back in 2017 with legal thriller Innocent Defendant, which was a hit and topped viewership ratings. Ji earned acclaim for playing the diverse emotions of the character, an amnesic prosecutor who finds himself on a death row. He received the Grand Prize award at the SBS Drama Awards.

In 2018, Ji starred in the fantasy romance comedy drama Familiar Wife. The same year he starred in the period comedy film Feng Shui.

In 2019, Ji starred television series Doctor John. It is his first medical drama in 11 years.

In 2020, Ji appeared in tvN's travel show RUN alongside Kang Ki-young, Lee Tae-sun and Hwang Hee.

In 2021, Ji Sung starred in the mystery legal drama The Devil Judge with his previous co-star Kim Min-jung who he worked together 13 years ago in the drama New Heart. In August 2021, Namoo Actors' contract expired and Ji Sung decided not to renew it.

In January 2022, Ji-sung signed an exclusive contract with Surpass Entertainment.He starred in a mystery drama called Adamas, which aired from July 27 to September 15, 2022. Ji Sung played the roles of the twin brothers who pair up to uncover the mystery of a murder that occurred 22 years ago.

Personal life
He met actress Lee Bo-young on the set of 2004 TV series Save Last Dance for Me, and they confirmed their relationship in 2007. On 2 August 2013, the couple announced their engagement by uploading handwritten letters on their respective official fan sites. They married at Aston House, W Seoul Walkerhill Hotel on 27 September 2013. Their first child, a daughter named Kwak Ji-yoo, was born on 13 June 2015. Their second child, a son named Kwak Woo-sung, was born on 5 February 2019.

Filmography

Film

Television series

Television show

Hosting

Music video appearances

Discography

Singles

Awards and nominations

State honors

Notes

References

External links
 
 Ji Sung at Namoo Actors 

1977 births
Living people
People from Yeosu
South Korean male television actors
South Korean male film actors
South Korean Christians
21st-century South Korean male actors